Domenico Rao (born 11 June 1977) is a male track and field sprinter from Italia who specializes in the 400 metres. His personal best time is 47.09 seconds, achieved in 1998.

Biography
He won a gold medal in the 4 x 400 metres relay at the 2009 European Indoor Championships, together with teammates Jacopo Marin, Matteo Galvan and Claudio Licciardello.

Achievements

See also
 Italy national relay team

References

External links
 

1977 births
Living people
Italian male sprinters
Sportspeople from Catania
Athletics competitors of Centro Sportivo Carabinieri